Strongylaspis is a genus of beetles in the longhorn beetle family, Cerambycidae.

The following species are recocognised in the genus Strongylaspis:

 Strongylaspis antonkozlovi Galileo & Santos-Silva, 2018
 Strongylaspis aureus Monné & Santos-Silva, 2003
 Strongylaspis batesi Lameere, 1903
 Strongylaspis bolivianus Monné & Santos-Silva, 2003
 Strongylaspis bullatus Bates, 1872
 Strongylaspis championi Bates, 1884
 Strongylaspis christianae Monné & Santos-Silva, 2003
 Strongylaspis corticarius (Erichson in Schomburg, 1848)
 Strongylaspis dohrni Lameere, 1903
 Strongylaspis fryi Lameere, 1912
 Strongylaspis graniger Bates, 1884
 Strongylaspis hirticollis Tippmann, 1953
 Strongylaspis kraepelini Lameere, 1903
 Strongylaspis macrotomoides Tippmann, 1953
 Strongylaspis migueli Monné & Santos-Silva, 2003
 Strongylaspis sericans Tippmann, 1953
 Strongylaspis sericeus Zajciw, 1970

References

Further reading
 Monné, M. L. and A. Santos-Silva. (2003). Sinopse do gênero Strongylaspis Thomson, 1860 (Coleoptera, Cerambycidae, Prioninae, Macrotomini). Rev Bras Entomol 47(1) 31–47.
Santos-Silva, A. and J. R. Esteban Durán. (2009). Description of the female of Strongylaspis granigera Bates, 1884 (Coleoptera, Cerambycidae, Prioninae). Spanish Journal of Agricultural Research 7(2) 349–54. (with key to the females of Strongylaspis)

Prioninae